The 2022–23 Russian First League is the 31st season of Russia's second-tier football league since the dissolution of the Soviet Union. The season will begin on 16 July 2022, and will have a 3 month winter break between game weeks 20 and 21 (November to March). For the first time, 18 teams will participate instead of 20  On 23 June 2022, the league was renamed from Russian Football National League to Russian First League.

Stadia by capacity

Team changes

To FNL
 Promoted from FNL2
 Dynamo Makhachkala
 Rodina Moscow
 Volga Ulyanovsk
 Shinnik Yaroslavl

 Relegated from Premier League
 Arsenal Tula
 Rubin Kazan
 Ufa

From FNL
 Relegated to Second League
 Metallurg Lipetsk
 Rotor Volgograd
 Tekstilshchik Ivanovo

 Dissolved
 FC Spartak-2 Moscow
 Olimp-Dolgoprudny
 Tom Tomsk

 Promoted to Premier League
 Torpedo Moscow
 Orenburg
 Fakel Voronezh

Stadia by locations

League table

Positions by round

Results by round

Results

Season statistics

Top goalscorers

Discipline
 Most yellow cards: 71
Volgar Astrakhan

 Most red cards: 6
Rodina Moscow

References

2022–23 in Russian football leagues
Russian First League seasons
Russian
Current association football seasons